Colborne Street may refer to:
 Colborne Street, Toronto
 To a street in Montreal which was formerly called Colborne Street.